The 2022 NME Awards, also named BandLab NME Awards 2022, were held on 2 March 2022 at the O2 Academy Brixton in London and were hosted by actress Daisy May Cooper and rapper Lady Leshurr. The nominations were announced on 27 January 2022. Sam Fender, Rina Sawayama, Griff with Sigrid, Berwyn, Chvrches with Robert Smith, FKA Twigs and Bring Me The Horizon performed on the night.

American singer Halsey received the Innovation Award, while American songwriter and producer Jack Antonoff received the Songwriter Award. English singer FKA twigs received the Godlike Genius Award.

Winners and nominees

Special Awards
Godlike Genius Award
 FKA Twigs

Innovation Award
 Halsey

Songwriter Award
 Jack Antonoff

Hero of the Year
 Tomorrow X Together

Villain of the Year
 Jacob Rees-Mogg

References

External links
Official website

2022 music awards
2022 in London
2022 in British music
Culture in London
New Musical Express